Anton Gottstein (7 December 1893 – 22 August 1982) was a Czechoslovak cross-country skier. He competed in the men's 18 kilometre event at the 1924 Winter Olympics.

References

External links
 

1893 births
1982 deaths
Czechoslovak male cross-country skiers
Olympic cross-country skiers of Czechoslovakia
Cross-country skiers at the 1924 Winter Olympics
People from Vrchlabí
Sportspeople from the Hradec Králové Region